is a Japanese football player. He plays for Fagiano Okayama.

Career
Ryuta Ishikawa joined J2 League club Fagiano Okayama in 2017. On July 12, he debuted in Emperor's Cup (v AC Nagano Parceiro).

References

External links

1999 births
Living people
Association football people from Saitama Prefecture
Japanese footballers
J2 League players
Fagiano Okayama players
Association football forwards